Shyamal-Saumil is an Indian classical music duo formed in 1980, in Ahmedabad, Gujarat, India, composed of the Gujarati singers, Dr. Shyamal Munshi and Saumil Munshi. Shyamal-Saumil achieved both critical acclaim and commercial success in the 1980s and early 1990s, helping to popularize Gujarati classical music, known as "Sugam Sangeet" while experimenting, innovating, and branching out into other forms of media, like cinema and theatre. Shyamal-Saumil are known for their inclusive music, having created a plethora of albums for children, adolescents, and adults, and also having delved into and having explored different cultures and religious folk music in their works.

History 
Saumil Munshi was born on September 5, 1960, while Shyamal Munshi was born on April 14, 1962, in Ahmedabad, India, to their father Paresh Munshi and mother Bhaktida Munshi. The passion for music and literature was instilled at a young age by their school activities. The two used to go to performances and competitions, where they used to recite ghazals and poems. In 1973, they joined the Jagh Mag Mandal, where they used to perform a variety of music, from film songs to classical poetry.

1980–1984: Formation and debut 
In 1980, the two gave their debut organized solo performance, titled, "Morpichch", a sold-out show. The show launched their careers and gave them credibility and fame. The shows were repeated in Kolkata and Mumbai as well, and over the course of the first 5 years, they gave 20 shows in 3 cities.

1984-2000: Performances, Meghdhanoosh, and Acclaim 
In 1995, Shyamal-Saumil released Meghdhanoosh, initially in cassette form, dedicated entirely to kids. The album comprised 45 songs on different morals and themes, and was largely sung by kids themselves. To this date, Meghdhanoosh remains the duo's best-selling album, selling over 25,000 copies.

2000-2002: Further Success and Swarsetu 
Having earned fame and success, Shyamal-Saumil, in late 2000, launched "Swarsetu", a listeners forum, to promote "Sugam Sangeet" and "Kavya Sangeet", as well as to introduce new and upcoming artists while staying true to the culture. Since 2000, Shyamal-Saumil have organized over 90 performances, each with a different theme and message. Swarsetu also allows children and adolescents to showcase their talents and imbibe roots and foundations into them.

2002-2005: Hastakshar and Critical Reception 
In 2002, Shyamal-Saumil released the biggest collaborative project of their career, a 6-album project called, "Hastakshar", with each album containing songs by a different illustrious poet and lyricist. These poets were Tushar Shukla, Raman Patel, Ramesh Parekh, Suresh Dalal, and Umashankar Joshi, and for their songs, Shyamal-Saumil brought together 30 artists to create the project. The title song was sung by Jagjit Singh, and other famous Bollywood singers also gave their voices for the songs. These included Kavita Krishnamurthy, Shankar Mahadevan, Udit Narayan, Sadhana Sargam, Bhupendar Singh, and Shubha Joshi. Shreya Goshal sang her first Gujarati song on the album's track, "Aaj Maaru Mann". The album was extolled for its versatility and its richness in quality.

2005-present: Anushthaan, Swarsetu, and legacy 
In 2012, the Swarsetu News Digest was launched by Shyamal-Saumil, a monthly magazine, which showcased art, literature, music, poetry, and drama in Gujarat. The magazine also invited famous authors and poets to write columns, and was catered for all ages. Since then, the magazine has also launched several competitions and literature fests, and workshops are organized in several schools to help propagate Gujarati culture.

Aapnu Amdavad Surilu Amdavad was a project released in 2011 to celebrate the heritage of the city of Ahmedabad. All the songs in the album were accompanied with videos, making the album one of the first music video albums in Gujarati music. The videos had notable appearances by the then-Mayor of Ahmedabad, Asit Vora, and Indian cricketer, Parthiv Patel, and also featured songs dedicated to the festival of kites, Uttarayan, and to Manekchowk, a prominent city square in Ahmedabad.

In 2014, Shyamal-Saumil organized a 3-day music festival called Anushthaan, an event which the Times of India called a "spectacle for music-lovers." The event featured artists from all around Gujarat, including Parthiv Gohil, Aishwariya Majmudar, Hema Desai, Dipali Somaiyya, and nearly 50 other musicians and artists. In 2015 and 2016, the event was repeated with further critical acclaim and success, and featured a plethora of artists, a lineup which included Maati Baani, Bhoomi Trivedi, Osman Mir, Aalap Desai, Aashit Desai, the Tabla Taalim Sanstha, Rhythm Pulze, and nearly 80 other artists. The events also included dance performances by Chandan and Nirali Thakore, Maulik and Ishira Shah. Being an ensemble of the arts, Anushthaan also included several poets, stand-up comedians, and actors, who gave talks, speeches, and performances. Renowned artists like Sairam Dave, Jay Vasavda, RJ Dhvanit, Tushar Shukla, Darshan Jariwala, Harsh Brahmbhatt, Archan Trivedi, and Abhishek Jain were among the celebrities present. In 2015, the event featured Gujarat's first LED floor, and in 2016, the very first Gujarati a cappella performance was presented. New techniques like projection mapping and optical illusion dances were also performed.

Collaborations 
With Red FM, Shyamal Saumil produced 4 albums, focusing mainly on garba, while also fusing Gujarati pop with traditional folk. These albums are:
 Bajate Raho Beshaq Bindass
 Red Raas Garba Vol. 1
 Red Raas Garba Vol. 2
 Red Raas Garba Vol. 3

Filmography 
Shyamal-Saumil have lent their music for several films, of which, Bhale Padharya won them the Cine-Aishwariya Best Music Director Award.
 Bhale Padharya: Welcome to Gujarat (2011) 
 Mission Mummy
 Hun Hunshi Hunshilal
Apart from cinema, the duo have also produced music and have sung for several TV Shows, which include:
 Vaanarsena
 Grahan
 Maare Pann Ek Ghar Hoy
 Ramat Ramaade Ramo
 Kalrav na Koyda (with Doordarshan)

Discography 
 Studio Albums
Throughout the span of their 37-year career, Shyamal-Saumil have produced a total of 21 albums. These albums follow distinct themes, and are thus split into 4 categories.

Chanchal

The albums under this category are typically for adolescents and young adults. These include: 
 Rangtaal (2005)
 Aapnun Amdavad Surilun Amdavad (2012)
 Aasneh (2014)
Sheetal

The "Sheetal" category of albums comprises ghazals and more poetic pieces, and these cover a wide range of themes. Albums under this section include: 
 Aabshaar (2016)
 Mara Hissa No Suraj (2016)
 Meh Jharmar (2014)
 Swarsaavan (2014)
 Swarkavan (2013)
 Rajuat (2011)
 Morpichch (2005)
 Hastakshar (2002)
Nirmal

Consisting of devotional songs and songs of worship, the Nirmal category has the following albums:
 Shiv Dhoon (2013)
 Shivmahim Stotram (2013)
 Bhavsarita (2006)
 Maha Mantra (2005)
 Dhoon (2002)
 Jin Vandana (2000)
 Jin Mangal (1998)
Komal

An entire section dedicated to children, the songs under this section usually carry a message or a moral, and are often sung by children themselves. The albums include: 
 Tim Tim Taara (2014)
 Allak Mallak (2005)
 Meghdhanoosh (1999)

List of awards and nominations received by Shyamal-Saumil 
 Gujarat State Gaurav Puraskar (2006–2007)
 Best Music Director (2011–2012): Bhale Padharya: Welcome to Gujarat
 Girnar Swarshiromani Puraskar (2012)
 Chaalo Gujarat: Award for Excellence (2012): Saumil Munshi
 JSAF Naari Shakti Award (2013): Aarti Munshi
 Arpan Patra for tour to Sydney (2015)
 Transmedia 11th Annual Gujarati Screen and Stage Awards (2011)
 Nishtha Patra for Anushthaan (2014)
 Trend-setter of the Year (2014) by Gujarati Innovation Society
 Power Hundred Eminent Personalities of Gujarat (Divya Bhaskar)
 Women of Substance: Aarti Munshi by Divya Bhaskar

References 

Sibling musical duos
Indian classical music